Huntsville is an unincorporated community in Reno County, Kansas, United States.  It is located north of Plevna along 4th Ave.

History
A post office was opened in Huntsville in 1878, and remained in operation until it was discontinued in 1905.

Education
The community is served by Fairfield USD 310 public school district.

References

Further reading

External links
 Reno County maps: Current, Historic, KDOT

Unincorporated communities in Reno County, Kansas
Unincorporated communities in Kansas
1878 establishments in Kansas
Populated places established in 1878